The Men's 800 Freestyle event at the 10th FINA World Aquatics Championships swam on July 24–25, 2003 in Barcelona, Spain. Preliminary heats of the event were swum during the morning session on July 24, with the Final being held during the evening session on July 25.

Prior to the start of the event, the existing World (WR) and Championship (CR) records were both:
WR & CR: 7:39.16 swum by Ian Thorpe (Australia) on July 24, 2001 in Fukuoka, Japan

Results

Final

Preliminaries

References

World Aquatics Championships
Swimming at the 2003 World Aquatics Championships